Boris Cyrulnik (birth 26 July 1937 in Bordeaux) is a French doctor, ethologist, neurologist, and psychiatrist.

As a Jewish child during World War II, he was entrusted to a foster family for his own protection. In 1943 he was taken with adults in a Nazi-led capture in Bordeaux. He avoided detention by hiding for a while in the restrooms and later being hidden from Nazi searches as a farm boy under the name Jean Laborde until the end of the war. Both of his parents were arrested and murdered during World War II. His own survival motivated his career in psychiatry. He studied medicine at the University of Paris. He has written several books of popular science on psychology. He is known in France for developing and explaining to the public the concept of Psychological resilience.

He is a professor at the University of the South, Toulon-Var.
He was awarded the 2008 Prix Renaudot de l'essai.

Works

In French 
 , ed. Hachette, 1983.
 , ed. Hachette, 1989.
 , ed. Hachette, 1991.
 , ed. Odile Jacob, 1993.
 , with Émile Noël, ed. Seuil, 1995.
 , ed. Odile Jacob, 1997.
  ed. Hachette Littérature, 1998.
English translation: The Dawn of Meaning
 , ed. Odile Jacob, 1999; re-edition in 2002.
 , with Edgar Morin, ed. de l'Aube, 2000.
 , ed. Odile Jacob, 2001.
 , ed. de l'Aube, 2003.
 , ed. Odile Jacob, 2003; ed. Odile Jacob poches, 2005;
English translation: The Whispering of Ghosts: Trauma and Resilience, 2005.
 , ed. Odile Jacob, 2004.
English translation: Talking of Love on the Edge of a Precipice, 2007.
 , ed. l'Aube, 2005.
 , ed. Odile Jacob, 2006.
 , ed. Odile Jacob, 2008.
 , ed. L'Esprit du temps, coll. "Textes essentiels", 2009; ed. Odile Jacob poches, 2010.
 , ed. Odile Jacob, 2010.
 , ed. Odile Jacob, 2011.
 , ed. Odile Jacob, 2012.
 , ed. Odile Jacob, 2014.
 , ed. Odile Jacob, coll. «OJ-Psychologie», 2017.

In English 
 The Dawn of Meaning, ed. Mcgraw-Hill, coll. Horizons of Science, 1992.
Translation of: , ed. Hachette Littérature, 1998 .
 The Whispering of Ghosts: Trauma and Resilience, 2005.
Translation of: , ed. Odile Jacob, 2003.
 Talking of Love on the Edge of a Precipice , 2007.
Translation of: , ed. Odile Jacob, 2004.
 Resilience: How Your Inner Strength Can Set You Free from the Past, ed. Tarcher, 320 pages, 2011.

In German 
 , ed. Beltz GmbH, 2006, 232 pages.
Translation of: .
 , ed. Hoffmann und Campe. 2007, 272 pages .
Translation of: .
 , translated by Maria Buchwald and Andrea Alvermann, ed. Präsenz, 2011, 248 pages .
Translation of: , ed. Odile Jacob, 2010 .
 , ed. Ullstein Buch Verlage GmbH, Berlin, 2013, 281 pages
Translation of: , ed. Odile Jacob, 2012 .

Prefaces 
 Françoise Maffre-Castellani: Femmes déportées, Histoires de résilience
 Patrick Lemoine: Séduire, comment l'amour vient aux humains, Rouge, 2002.

Collected works 
 La Plus Belle Histoire des animaux, collectif, ed. Seuil, 2006.
 Si les lions pouvaient parler. Essais sur la condition animale, under direction of Boris Cyrulnik, ed. Gallimard, coll. "Quarto", Paris, 1998,.
 Boris Cyrulnik, "Instinct/Attachement", in Dictionnaire de la sexualité humaine, 200 blurbs by 122 coauthors, under direction of Philippe Brenot, ed. L'Esprit du temps, coll. "Les Dictionnaires", Paris, 2004, 736 pages, and Les Objets de la psychiatrie, conceptual dictionary, 230 blurbs by 150 auteurs, under direction of Yves Pélicier, ed. L'Esprit du temps, collection "Les Dictionnaires", Paris, 1997, 650 pages.
 Boris Cyrulnik and Claude Seron (dir.), La Résilience ou Comment renaître de sa souffrance, ed. Fabert, coll. "Penser le monde de l'enfant", Paris, 2004.
 Nicolas Martin, Antoine Spire, François Vincent and Boris Cyrulnik, La Résilience. Entretien avec Boris Cyrulnik, ed. Le Bord de l'eau, coll. "Nouveaux Classiques", Lormont, France, 2009, 111 pages.
 With Jean-Pierre Pourtois: École et résilience ed. Odile Jacob.
 Nous étions des enfants, introductory Talk to 10 DVD set made by Jean-Gabriel Carasso and produced by L'oizeau rare with the Comité École de la rue Tlemcen. This work presents 18 testimonies of children deported or hidden, because of being Jews, during the Second World War.

References

External links 

1937 births
Living people
French psychiatrists
Ethologists
French psychologists
20th-century French Jews
French people of Ukrainian-Jewish descent
French people of Polish-Jewish descent
Prix Renaudot de l'essai winners
University of Paris alumni
Scientists from Bordeaux
Officiers of the Légion d'honneur